Joint Accreditation System of Australia and New Zealand (JAS-ANZ) is an independent, third party accreditation body that provides internationally recognised accreditation services.

JAS-ANZ was established by International treaty titled Agreement between Australia and New Zealand concerning the Establishment of the Council of the Joint Accreditation System of Australia and New Zealand (JAS-ANZ) signed in Canberra on 30 October 1991, to strengthen the trading relationship between the two countries and with other countries.

Accreditation adds value to the ever growing and increasingly complicated market chain in many ways, including by providing a symbol of assurance that certifiers and inspectors are independent and competent to perform their duties.

JAS-ANZ accredits the bodies that certify or inspect organisations, products or people. They do so by developing the assessment criteria certifiers and inspectors must meet to become accredited under these themes:

 Business and Innovation
 Environment and Sustainability
 Food and Biological Systems
 Health and Human Services
Product Certification

JAS-ANZ offers accreditation for the following programs:

 Management systems certification such as quality management systems (AS/NZS ISO 9001), environmental management systems (AS/NZS ISO 14001) and others
 Product certification such as Codemark, Watermark and others
 Personnel certification
 Inspection
 Validation and verification

JAS-ANZ has accredited over 130 conformity assessment bodies (as of 2021) who have certified over 140,000 organisations in over 100 countries.

JAS-ANZ is a member of the International Accreditation Forum (IAF), the International Laboratory Accreditation Cooperation (ILAC) and the Asia Pacific Accreditation Cooperation (APAC).

References

External links
JAS-ANZ Homepage
IAF Homepage

Professional associations based in Australia
Standards organisations in Australia